Guémon Region (also known as Yémahin Region) is one of the 31 regions of Ivory Coast. Since its establishment in 2011, it has been one of three regions in Montagnes District. The seat of the region is Duékoué and the region's population in the 2021 census was 930,893.

Guémon is currently divided into four departments: Bangolo, Duékoué, Facobly, and Kouibly.

Name
In the 2011 decree that created the region, Guémon was referred to alternatively as the region of "Yémahin". Since its creation, the region has more commonly been referred to as "Guémon".

Notes

 
Regions of Montagnes District
States and territories established in 2011
2011 establishments in Ivory Coast